Donald R. Nowack (February 23, 1924 – January 7, 2008) was a former member of the Ohio House of Representatives.

1924 births
Democratic Party members of the Ohio House of Representatives
2008 deaths
20th-century American politicians